Ponca venosa is a species of cricket in the family Gryllidae.

References

Crickets
Insects described in 1928